Douglas da Silva (born 7 March 1984 in Florianópolis) is a Brazilian professional association football player who plays for Brusque as a central defender.

Career
Da Silva moved to Israel in 2005 to join Hapoel Kfar Saba. He quickly established himself as one of the best defenders in the Israeli league. After four years playing for Hapoel Kfar Saba he decided to leave the club after they were relegated to the second division and joined one of Israel's top clubs Hapoel Tel Aviv.

After signing with Hapoel Tel Aviv, he played for the first time in UEFA club competitions, In May 2010, he won the country double (both Championship and State Cup). He qualified with Hapoel to the 2010–11 UEFA Champions League Group Stage and on November 24 he scored his first Champions League goal against S.L. Benfica in a 3–0 victory.

On 19 December 2010, he agreed with the Austrian club Red Bull Salzburg where he joined in the transfer window on 11 January 2011, Hapoel Tel Aviv received €2.6 million for the deal, while Da Silva will earn €1 million per year with a five-year contract.

On 5 January 2011, Da Silva was blackmailed by a former teammate. Due to it, his move to Red Bull Salzburg was postponed until 11 January 2011 for police investigation.

In January 2013, he joined Figueirense on a loan deal.

In February 2014, he was loaned to Vasco da Gama. In December 2014, Vasco da Gama signed him on a permanent basis.

In 2016, he signed with Czech First League side Mladá Boleslav on a free transfer. He made his debut on 4 October in a Europa League qualifying match against Tetovo.

Honours
Israel State Cup (1):
2010
Israeli Premier League (1):
2009–10
Austrian League (1): 
2011–12
 Austrian Cup (1) : 
2011-12

Career statistics

References

1984 births
Living people
Brazilian footballers
Brazilian expatriate footballers
Association football utility players
Association football central defenders
Association football fullbacks
Avaí FC players
Israeli Premier League players
Hapoel Tel Aviv F.C. players
Hapoel Kfar Saba F.C. players
Austrian Football Bundesliga players
FC Red Bull Salzburg players
Figueirense FC players
CR Vasco da Gama players
Joinville Esporte Clube players
Campeonato Brasileiro Série B players
Expatriate footballers in Israel
Expatriate footballers in Austria
Czech First League players
FK Mladá Boleslav players
Expatriate footballers in the Czech Republic
Brazilian expatriate sportspeople in the Czech Republic
Sportspeople from Florianópolis